The 2020–21 ECAC Hockey men's ice hockey season was the 60th season of play for ECAC Hockey and took place during the 2020–21 NCAA Division I men's ice hockey season. The regular was delayed until on November 22, 2020 and conclude on March 6, 2021.

Season
Following the early conclusion to the 2020 season, there was a great deal of uncertainty about college hockey under the cloud of COVID-19. At the beginning of July, Rensselaer was one of the first schools to announce that it would be suspending all of its athletic programs until January at the earliest. Afterwards, most other ECAC programs prepared to begin the season at some unknown date. When the beginning of the season was tentatively set for November, many players began practicing in October. Yale ended up getting hit hard by the pandemic, having 18 players test positive just weeks before the first game was to be played. Partly as a result, the Ivy League made the decision to cancel all athletics for the 2020-21 scholastic year.

Six ECAC programs were members of the Ivy League and abided by the decision, which immediately cut the conference in half. Shortly afterwards, Rensselaer extended its suspensions to mirror those of the Ivies and were soon joined by Union. The result was that ECAC Hockey had only 4 active teams for the 2021 season. Due to the pandemic, the NCAA selection committee decided not to stick to the letter of their bylaws, which required six participating programs for a conference to receive an automatic bid for its tournament champion, and would include the ECAC champion in the NCAA tournament.

With just 4 teams available, the active programs went outside the ECAC to schedule non-conference games early in the season. Most games were played against Atlantic Hockey teams and resulted in Quinnipiac being the top-ranked ECAC program. That trend continued throughout the season and the Bobcats were not adversely affected in the national ranking despite playing what was regarded as a weak schedule. As the teams prepared to begin the ECAC tournament, Clarkson abruptly ended its season when several players violated university protocols regarding COVID safety. The tournament became a 3-team format as a result with Quinnipiac as the heavy favorite. St. Lawrence, however, pulled off a surprising upset and won their first league championship in 20 years.

With the Saints preparing for the national tournament, head coach Brent Brekke tested positive for COVID the very next day and the team was forced to withdraw. Quinnipiac, the regular season champion, was chosen as the ECAC representative instead and placed opposite Minnesota State in the first round. The Bobcats scored twice in the first period and then exchanged goals with the Mavericks to hold a 3–1 lead with just over 11 minutes remaining. MSU scored twice in the final 5:06 to tie the match and sent the game into overtime. With the late scored, all of the momentum swung to Minnesota State and Quinnipiac was constantly on their heels in the extra session. They were outshout 7–2 in just over 11 minutes and a scramble around the net resulted in the MSU earning the goal, ending probably the strangest ECAC season.

Standings

Coaches
Reid Cashman was hired on June 1, 2020, however, due to the COVID-19 pandemic he did not coach this season.

Records

Statistics

Leading scorers
GP = Games played; G = Goals; A = Assists; Pts = Points; PIM = Penalty minutes

Leading goaltenders
Minimum 1/3 of team's minutes played in conference games.

GP = Games played; Min = Minutes played; GA = Goals against; SO = Shutouts; SV% = Save percentage; GAA = Goals against average

ECAC tournament

Note: * denotes overtime period(s)

NCAA tournament

Regional semifinal

West

Ranking

USCHO

USA Today

Awards

NCAA

ECAC

Conference tournament

2021 NHL Entry Draft

† incoming freshman

References

External links

2020–21 ECAC Hockey men's ice hockey season
ECAC
2020–21